David Soren (born April 19, 1973) is a Canadian director, writer, voice actor, and storyboard artist at DreamWorks Animation. His most notable work are TV specials based on the Madagascar film franchise: Merry Madagascar and Madly Madagascar. He directed the 2013 animated feature film Turbo, which is based on his own original concept, as well as the 2017 animated film Captain Underpants: The First Epic Movie based on Dav Pilkey's Captain Underpants book series.

Early life and career
Soren was born in Toronto, Canada, was raised in Hamilton, and graduated from Sheridan College. His final student project, an animated short film, Mr. Lucky, received many accolades, and was accepted into competition for the 1997 Academy Award.  Before joining DreamWorks Animation, he worked at Toronto-based Nelvana as an animator and storyboard artist.

At DreamWorks, he worked as a story artist on Chicken Run, Shrek and Over the Hedge, and as head of story on Shark Tale. In 2009, he directed and wrote his first film, a TV Christmas special, Merry Madagascar, followed by a 2013 TV Valentine's Day special, Madly Madagascar, also written and directed by Soren.

Soren made his feature directorial debut in 2013, directing Turbo. It received mixed-to-positive reviews which won him an Annie Award for Directing in a Feature Production. He was also the creative consultant on its television series, Turbo Fast.

He voiced the muscle-sized baby Jimbo in The Boss Baby and directed his second feature film Captain Underpants: The First Epic Movie and voiced Tommy which is based on Dav Pilkey's comic books Captain Underpants, which the movie and books would later get adapted into an Netflix television series titled The Epic Tales of Captain Underpants. However, Soren was not involved with the show. He reprised his role as Jimbo in The Boss Baby's sequel, The Boss Baby: Family Business.

Soren is set to direct a full-length feature film for Paramount Animation titled Under the Boardwalk.

Filmography

Film

Television

References

External links

  David Soren on Twitter

1973 births
Living people
Artists from Toronto
Canadian male voice actors
Canadian male screenwriters
Canadian storyboard artists
Canadian animated film directors
Canadian television directors
DreamWorks Animation people
Film directors from Toronto
Male actors from Toronto
Writers from Toronto
21st-century Canadian screenwriters